is the Japanese word for walnut. It is also a given name in Japan, primarily for women (though occasionally for men, such as novelist Kurumi Inui). It may refer to:

People

Actors
, female child actress
, female voice actress
, female actress, formerly in the Flower Troupe of the Takarazuka Revue

, female voice actress

Authors
, male mystery novelist
, female manga artist
, female manga artist and illustrator

Idols
, female tarento
, female tarento
, female idol and member of Bishōjo Club 31
, former female electropop idol

Musicians
, female musician, formerly with the stage name 
, stage name of Natsue Washizu for her music career (such as the eponymous theme song for the anime Attack No. 1)
, stage name of musician Ayumi Hamasaki during her early modelling days
, former stage name of anime singer Riryka

Sports
, Japanese snowboarder
, female tennis player
, Japanese synchronized swimmer

Fictional characters
 Kurumi (クルミ), a character in the anime Lycoris Recoil 
 Kurumi Ebisuzawa (惠飛須沢 胡桃), a character in the anime Gakkou Gurashi
, a character in the manga Needless
, the titular character of the manga Steel Angel Kurumi
, the protagonist of the shōjo manga Haou Airen
, a character in the eroge video game Bible Black
, a character in the anime Kimagure Orange Road
, a character in the anime Seraphim Call
, a character in the anime Yes! PreCure 5
, a character in the science-fiction manga Wingman
, the titular character in the Ryō Takase shōjo manga 
, a character in the manga Pani Poni
, a character in the Shinmai Maou no Keiyakusha
, a character in the anime Sundome
, a character in the dating sim game Ijiwaru My Master
, a character in the anime Date A Live
, the protagonist of the 1995 dorama White Love Story
Erika Kurumi, a character in the anime HeartCatch PreCure!
, a character in the shōjo manga Kimi ni Todoke with the nickname Kurumi
Princess Kurumi (Kurumi-Hime) is the protagonist of the game SEGA Ninja (Ninja Princess in Japan). She fights enemies using knives and throwing stars. Kurumi is also considered one of the first female protagonists in video games.

Horticulture
Juglans ailantifolia, the Japanese walnut, a species of walnut that is native to Japan.

Other uses
, a song by Mr. Children and one of the A-sides of their 2003 single, "Tenohira" / "Kurumi", and the theme song for the Takashi Komatsu film .
The GR-KURUMI board incorporates the 16-bit, low-power consumption, RL78/G13 Group MCU (R5F100GJAFB). Compatible with Arduino Pro Mini, this board can use existing sample codes, ensuring easy use with the Arduino language and standard libraries from both hardware and software aspects.

References

Japanese unisex given names